Rheunus or Rheunos was a village in the territory of Caphyae, in Arcadian Azania in ancient Arcadia, Greece. 

Rheunus was the place where the waters from the Orchomenus plain resurfaced as the river Tragus.

References

Populated places in ancient Arcadia
Arcadian Azania
Former populated places in Greece
Lost ancient cities and towns